Écoust-Saint-Mein is a commune in the Pas-de-Calais département in the Hauts-de-France region of France.

Geography

History 
During World War I, Écoust-Saint-Mein was located on the Hindenburg Line when its inhabitants were evacuated by German forces. The church tower was mined and served as a landmark for gunners. Following the battle of Arras in 1917, it was captured by the Allies until it was recaptured by the Germans in March 1918 and finally retaken on 3 September 1918.

Population

Places of interest
 The church of St. Mein, dating from the sixteenth century.
 Traces of an old castle.
 World War I cemeteries.

In popular culture 
In the 2019 film 1917, Écoust-Saint-Mein is depicted as a ruined waypoint on the mission of the main character. The film's depiction of the town is largely based on actual history. As the town became a war zone during the First World War, the villagers had no choice but to abandon Écoust-Saint-Mein, returning after the war to rebuild. Fictional elements were also integrated, however, such as the river crossing the town.

See also
Communes of the Pas-de-Calais department

References

External links

 The CWGC British cemetery
 The CWGC Military cemetery
 The H.A.C cemetery

Ecoustsaintmein